Kelsborrow Castle is an Iron Age hill fort in Cheshire, northern England. Hill forts were fortified hill-top settlements constructed across Britain during the Iron Age. It is one of only seven hill forts in the county of Cheshire and was probably in use for only a short time. In the 19th century, a bronze palstave was recovered from the site. It is protected as a Scheduled Ancient Monument.

Location
Although there are over 1,300 hill forts in England, most are concentrated in southern England, and there are only seven in Cheshire. Along with Eddisbury and Oakmere, Kelsborrow forms a small cluster of Iron Age hill forts within  of each other, near the Mouldsworth Gap, a break in the central ridge that runs north–south through Cheshire. The hill forts at Eddisbury and Oakmere lie to the north-east and east respectively. The site overlooks the Cheshire Plain to the west, south-west, and south.

Layout
As well as being a hill fort, Kelsborrow Castle is a type of promontory fort, as it exploits the natural steep slopes of the area to create a defensive site. This is probably because the ground slopes sharply away where there is no ditch. The entrance of the fort is probably in the south-east. Multivallate (more than one series of earthworks) forts are common in southern England; that Kelsborrow Castle is single vallate (i.e. it has only one ditch and bank) means it is probably a one-phase site, indicating it would only have been used for a short time. The hill fort is similar in typology to the hill forts at Bradley, and Oakmere, in Cheshire, and Castercliff and Portfield in Lancashire.

Preservation and current state
Geophysical surveys and small-scale archaeological excavations in 1973 and 1996 indicated that there may be structures such as storage pits buried within the hill fort. The site is part of wider agricultural land and suffers erosion from vehicles and livestock movement. Animal burrows and the spread of bracken also pose a threat to the site. Although the site is designated as "at low risk", a more recent survey has suggested changing it to "at high risk" because of activities such as ploughing at Kelsborrow Castle. Five of the hill forts in Cheshire have been assessed as being "at high risk" compared to 15% of North West England's Scheduled Monuments.

See also

Scheduled Monuments in Cheshire (pre-1066)

References
Citations

Sources

Hill forts in Cheshire
Buildings and structures in Cheshire
Scheduled monuments in Cheshire